Michael Franklin may refer to:

 Michael J. Franklin, American software entrepreneur and computer scientist
 Michael T. Franklin (born 1952), American musician and record producer
 Sir Michael Franklin (civil servant), English civil servant
Michael Francklin, or Franklin, lieutenant governor of Nova Scotia